Antiquity is an academic journal dedicated to the subject of archaeology. It publishes six issues a year, covering topics worldwide from all periods. Its current editor is Robert Witcher, Associate Professor of Archaeology at the University of Durham. Since 2015, the journal has been published by Cambridge University Press.

Antiquity was founded by the British archaeologist O. G. S. Crawford in 1927 and originally called Antiquity: A Quarterly Review of Archaeology. The journal is owned by the Antiquity Trust, a registered charity. The current trustees are Graeme Barker, Amy Bogaard, Robin Coningham (chair), Barry Cunliffe, Roberta Gilchrist, Anthony Harding, Carl Heron, Martin Millett, Nicky Milner, Stephanie Moser, and Cameron Petrie.

List of editors 
 O. G. S. Crawford (1927–1957)
 Glyn Daniel (1958–1986)
 Christopher Chippindale (1987–1997)
 Caroline Malone (1998–2002)
 Martin Carver (2003–2012)
 Chris Scarre (2013–2017)
Robert Witcher (2018–present)

Editorial board 
Antiquity's editorial advisory board has 25 members from Australia, Brazil, China, France, Germany, Japan, New Zealand, Philippines, Russia, the UK and the United States.

References

External links 

 

Archaeology journals
Cambridge University Press academic journals
Archaeological organizations